Alan is a village in the Şemdinli District of Hakkâri Province in southeastern Turkey. The population of the village was 407 in 2022. It is populated by the Kurdish Zerzan tribe who have close links to their counterparts in Iran.

The hamlet of Cevizpınar is attached to the village.

History
Hālānā (today called Alan) was inhabited by 100 Assyrian families in 1877 when visited by Edward Lewes Cutts, all of whom were adherents of the Church of the East and were served by two functioning churches as part of the archdiocese of Shemsdin. It was destroyed by the Ottoman Army in 1915 amidst the Sayfo.

Geography
The Fritillaria imperialis plant grows in the village.

Population 
Population history of the village from 2007 to 2022:

References

Bibliography

Villages in Şemdinli District
Historic Assyrian communities in Turkey
Places of the Assyrian genocide
Kurdish settlements in Hakkâri Province